E 013 is a European B class road in Kazakhstan, connecting the cities Sary-Ozek - Koktal.

Route 

Sary-Ozek
Koktal

External links 
 UN Economic Commission for Europe: Overall Map of E-road Network (2007)

International E-road network
European routes in Kazakhstan